Poliosia marginata is a moth in the family Erebidae. It was described by George Hampson in 1900. It is found on Borneo and Java. The habitat consists of lowland dipterocarp forests.

Adults are pale straw coloured, the hindwings with a slightly darker border.

References

Moths described in 1900
Lithosiina